O'Farrill is a Hispanic surname derived from the Old Irish patronym Ó Fearghail. Notable people with the surname include:

Arturo O'Farrill (born 1960), Mexican musician based in New York, son of Chico
Chico O'Farrill (1921–2001), Cuban musician
Gonzalo O'Farrill y Herrera (1754–1831), Cuban soldier
Rómulo O'Farrill (1917–2006), Mexican businessman
Yordan O'Farrill (born 1993), Cuban sprinter